I Know This Much Is True is the second novel by Wally Lamb, published in 1998. It was featured in Oprah's Book Club for June 1998.

Plot summary
The novel takes place in Three Rivers, Connecticut, in the early 1990s. Dominick Birdsey's identical twin, Thomas, suffers from paranoid schizophrenia. With medication, Thomas is able to live his life in relative peace and work at a coffee stand, but occasionally he has severe episodes of his illness. Thinking he is making a sacrificial protest that will stop the Gulf War, Thomas cuts off his own hand while at a public library. Dominick sees him through the ensuing decision not to attempt to reattach the hand, and makes efforts on his behalf to free him from what he knows to be an inadequate and depressing hospital for the dangerously mentally ill.

In the process, Dominick contemplates his own difficult life as Thomas's brother, his marriage to his gorgeous ex-wife, which ended after their only child died of SIDS, and his ongoing hostility toward his stepfather. Dominick also displays classic symptoms of PTSD, as a result of stressors in his adult life. First in Thomas's interests, and then for his own sake, he sees a therapist, Dr. Rubina Patel, a psychologist employed by the hospital. She helps Dominick come to understand Thomas's illness better and the family's accommodations or reactions to it.

In the course of Thomas's treatment, Dominick is covertly informed of sexual abuse taking place in the hospital, and helps to expose the perpetrators. He succeeds in getting Thomas released, but Thomas soon dies, apparently by suicide. After Thomas's death, Dominick discovers the identity of their birth father, who was part African American and part Native American–a secret their mother had shared with Thomas, but not with him.

In the midst of this, Dominick is also reading the autobiography of his grandfather, Italian/Sicilian-born Domenico Tempesta, which discloses details about the legacy of twins in their family. Dominick learns about himself and his mother through learning about his grandfather.

He also learns that his live-in girlfriend, Joy, has been seeing a gentleman on the side who is her bisexual half-uncle, and has also let him watch her and Dominick during sex on previous occasions. She is also HIV-positive, having contracted it from her secret lover. She asks Dominick to raise her baby if she dies. At first Dominick resists but later, after having found his way back into a relationship with his ex-wife, Dessa, they decide to remarry each other and adopt Joy's daughter. The book ends with Dominick able to cope with the considerable loss, failure, and sorrow in his personal and family history.

Characters
Dominick Birdsey: Protagonist.
Thomas Birdsey: Dominick's identical twin, a man with paranoid schizophrenia.
Dr. Patel: Thomas's psychologist at Hatch, Dominick's therapist.
Lisa Sheffer: Thomas's social worker, Dominick's friend.
Dessa Constantine: Dominick's ex-wife, whom he remarries.
Angela Birdsey: Dominick's and Dessa's baby daughter, dies of SIDS.
Concettina Ipolita Tempesta Birdsey: Thomas's and Dominick's mother, daughter of Domenico and Ignazia Tempesta.
Ray Birdsey: Thomas's and Dominick's stepfather.
Leo and Angie (Athena Constantine) Blood: Dominick's best friend, Dessa's younger sister.
Joy: Dominick's live-in girlfriend.
Tyffanie Rose: Joy's and Thad's biological daughter, and Dominick and Dessa's adopted daughter.
Thad: Joy's bisexual half-uncle and secret lover, Tyffanie Rose's father and great half-uncle.
Ralph Drinkwater: Penny Ann Drinkwater's twin and later found to be Thomas and Dominick's cousin.
Penny Ann Drinkwater: Ralph Drinkwater's twin, murdered as a small girl.
Domenico Onofrio Tempesta (1880–1949): Thomas's and Dominick's grandfather from Sicily.
Ignazia Tucci Tempesta (Violetta d'Annunzio): Dominick's beautiful grandmother from Pescara.
Prosperine Tucci ("The Monkey"): Ignazia's best friend and lover, loathed by Domenico Tempesta.
Pasquale Tempesta: Domenico Tempesta's younger brother.
Vincenzo Tempesta: youngest brother of Domenico Tempesta.
Concettina Ciccia: Dominick's great-grandmother; Domenico's mother.
Alfio and Maricchia Ciccia: Domenico's maternal grandparents.
Giacomo Tempesta: Domenico's father.

TV adaptation 

In October 2018, HBO announced they were planning a six-episode limited-series TV adaptation with Mark Ruffalo set to appear in the roles of both Dominick and Thomas Birdsey.

On March 1, 2020, HBO released a teaser trailer on YouTube for the limited series.

The series premiered on May 10, 2020.

References

1998 American novels
Novels set in Connecticut
HarperCollins books
American novels adapted into television shows
Works about twin brothers
Fictional portrayals of schizophrenia